Chevra Ahavas Yisroel (CAY) is a synagogue located in Crown Heights, Brooklyn. The congregation is associated with the Chabad Hasidic movement.

Activities
The synagogue was founded in 2010, and purchased a permanent synagogue building in 2012. Although the congregants are mostly members of the Chabad movement, services include litigurical styles similar to Carlebach minyanim. The congregation has garnered local attention for their popular programming.

See also
Chabad
Chabad hipsters
Carlebach movement

References

External links
 Official website

Chabad in the United States
Chabad organizations
Crown Heights, Brooklyn
Jewish organizations based in the United States
Synagogues in Brooklyn